EA is an initialism for Electronic Arts, an American video game company.

EA, E.A., Ea, or ea may also refer to:

Arts and media
 Eä, the World that Is of J. R. R. Tolkien's Middle-earth universe
 Ea, fictional world of EA Cycle by David Zindell
 EA, a designation for the El-Amarna letters, ancient Egyptian correspondence
 "EA", a 2017 song by Young Nudy and 21 Savage from the mixtape Slimeball 3

In business
 Enrolled agent, a federally authorized tax practitioner in the United States
 Enrolled actuary, a federally licensed actuary in the United States
 Executive assistant
 Enterprise architecture, a framework to analyse an enterprise
 Euro Area or Eurozone, a monetary union in Europe

Businesses and organisations

Airlines
 Ándalus Líneas Aéreas (IATA code 2008-2010)
 European Air Express (IATA code 1999-2007)
 Eastern Air Lines (IATA code 1925-1991)

Education
 City of Hialeah Education Academy, a school in Hialeah, Florida
 Edinburgh Academy, a school in Edinburgh, Scotland 
 Episcopal Academy, a school in Newtown, Pennsylvania
 Education Authority

Sports
 European Athletic Association, commonly known as European Athletics

Other businesses and organizations
 Engine Alliance, a joint venture between General Electric and Pratt & Whitney
 Electricity Association, a former association of electricity companies in the United Kingdom
 Engineers Australia, a professional body
 Environment Agency, a regulatory body for the environment in England, part of the Department for Environment, Food and Rural Affairs
 Eusko Alkartasuna, a Basque political party
 Emotions Anonymous, a program for those seeking to improve their mental or emotional health
 Enterprise Architect (software), a visual modeling and design tool based on the OMG UML

Places
 Eko Atlantic, a city in Lagos State, Nigeria
 Ea, Biscay, a town in the Basque province of Biscay, Spain
 Ceuta and Melilla, Spanish sovereign territories (ISO 3166-1 alpha-2  Exceptionally Reserved code EA)

Religion
 Ea (Babylonian god) or Enki, a water deity
 Evangelical Alliance, a UK group of Evangelical Christians
 Ecumenical Accompanier, a participant in the Ecumenical Accompaniment Programme in Palestine and Israel

In science and technology

Units
 Exaampere (EA), an SI unit of electric current
 Activation energy (Ea), in chemistry
 Exa-annum (Ea), a unit of time

Other uses in science and technology
 Material Testing Program EA (Edgewood Arsenal) numbers
 Electron affinity
 Ethyl acetate
 Electrophilic addition, a type of reaction in organic chemistry
 EMC EA/EB diesel locomotive, a cab-equipped lead unit
 Eosin Azure, a polychrome cytoplasmic stain used in the Papanicolaou stain
 Evolutionary algorithm, an optimization algorithm
 Extended Attribute, a computer file system feature

Other uses
 Effective altruism, a social movement and philosophy for determining the most effective ways to benefit others
 ea, a digraph in the list of Latin-script digraphs
 Ea Ea, also known as Craige Schensted, a mathematician and game designer 
 Environmental assessment, a legislative decision-making process
 Engineering Aide (US Navy), a Seabee occupational rating in the U.S. Navy
 Episodic ataxia, an incoordination disorder
 Early action, a form of college admission in the United States